Shelley Tepperman is a Quebec-based Canadian writer and translator. She has been nominated for the Governor General's Award for French to English translation multiple times.

Early life and education 
Tepperman was born in Toronto. She has a BA in Canadian Studies from the University of Toronto and an MA from the Université du Québec à Montréal in Art Dramatique.

Works 
Translations:

 La Repetition - originally by Dominic Champagne
 In Vitro - originally written by Yvan Bienvenue
 Wedding Day At The Cro-Magnons - originally written by Wajdi Mouawad
 The Tale Of Joan Avark - originally written by Louise Bombardier
 Unsettling Accounts - originally written by Yvan Bienvenue
 The Winners - originally written by Francois Archambault
 Alphonse - originally written by Wajdi Mouawad
 Tideline - originally written by Wajdi Mouawad
 Moliere - originally written by Sabina Berman
 Life Savers - originally written by Serge Boucher
 Between Pancho Villa and a Naked Woman - originally written by Sabina Berman
 Pacamambo - originally written by Wajdi Mouawad
 The List - originally written by Jennifer Tremblay
 The Carousel - originally written by Jennifer Tremblay
 In My Paper House - originally written by Philippe Dorin
 The Deliverance - originally written by Jennifer Tremblay

Awards

References

External links 

 
 Canadian Theatre Encyclopedia

Canadian translators
Living people
Writers from Toronto
Université du Québec à Montréal alumni
University of Toronto alumni
Year of birth missing (living people)